The following is a List of Roman wars and battles fought by the ancient Roman Kingdom, Roman Republic and Roman Empire against external enemies, organized by date. For civil wars, revolts and rebellions, see List of Roman civil wars and revolts.

8th century BC

Wars with the Latins and the Sabines (for the Rape of the Sabine Women)
Conquest of Cameria 
War with Fidenae and Veii

7th century BC
Second war with Fidenae and Veii 
Second Sabine War 
Roman–Latin wars

6th century BC

Roman-Sabine wars
War with the Volsci 
War with Gabii
War with the Rutuli
Roman-Etruscan wars
 509 BC – Battle of Silva Arsia – The Romans defeated the forces of Tarquinii and Veii led by the deposed king Lucius Tarquinius Superbus. One of the Roman consuls, Lucius Junius Brutus, is killed in battle.
 508 BC – War with Clusium – King Lars Porsena of Clusium besieges Rome on behalf of Tarquinius Superbus. The outcome is debated, but tradition states that it was a Roman victory.
Pometian Revolt (503–502 BC)
 502 BC – Battle of Pometia – The Romans put down the revolt of Pometia and Cora.

5th century BC 
 First Latin War (498–411 BC)
 497 BC – Battle of Lake Regillus – Aulus Postumius Albus Regillensis defeats Tarquinius Superbus.
 495 BC – Battle of Aricia – consul Publius Servilius Priscus Structus defeats the Aurunci.
  Wars with the Volsci and the Aequi (495 - 446 BC)
 493 BC – Battle of Corioli – the Volscian army is defeated thanks to the vigilance of Gnaeus Marcius.
 482 BC – Battle of Antium – the Volsci defeat consul Lucius Aemilius Mamercus.
 482 BC – Battle of Longula – consul Lucius Aemilius Mamercus defeats the Volsci the day after his defeat in the Battle of Antium.
 458 BC – Battle of Mount Algidus – Cincinnatus defeats the Aequi
 446 BC – Battle of Corbio – Titus Quinctius Capitolinus Barbatus leads Roman troops to defeat the Aequi and the Volsci.
 480 BC – Battle of Veii (480 BC) – Consuls Marcus Fabius Vibulanus and Gnaeus Manlius Cincinnatus win a heavy battle against Veians and their Etruscan allies. Gnaeus Manlius Cincinnatus and former consul Quintus Fabius are slain.
 477 BC –
 Battle of the Cremera – All the Fabii except Quintus Fabius Vibulanus are killed in battle with the Veii|Veians.
 Battle of the Temple of Hope – Consul Gaius Horatius Pulvillus fights indecisive battle with the Etruscans.
 Battle of Colline Gate (477 BC) – Consul Gaius Horatius Pulvillus has indecisive victory over the Etruscan civilization soon after the Battle of the Temple of Hope.

4th century BC
 Roman-Etruscan Wars 
 396 BC – Battle of Veii – Romans complete conquest of Veii
 Battle of Allia River (390 BC) – Gauls defeat the Romans, then sack Rome.
 First Samnite War (343–341 BC)
 342 BC – Battle of Mount Gaurus – Roman general Marcus Valerius Corvus defeats the Samnites.
 342 BC – Battle of Saticula – Roman general Aulus Cornelius Cossus Arvina barely escapes disaster and manages to defeat the Samnites.
 341 BC – Battle of Suessula – Roman consul Marcus Valerius Corvus defeats the Samnites once more.
 Latin War (340–338 BC)
 339 BC – Battle of Vesuvius – Romans under P. Decius Mus and T. Manlius Imperiosus Torquatus defeat the rebellious Latins.
 338 BC – Battle of Trifanum – Roman general T. Manlius Imperiosus Torquatus decisively defeats the Latins.
 Second Samnite War (326–304 BC)
 321 BC – Battle of the Caudine Forks – Romans under Spurius Postumius Albinus and T. Verturius Calvinus are defeated by the Samnites under Gaius Pontius.
 316 BC – Battle of Lautulae – Romans are defeated by the Samnites.
 305 BC – Battle of Bovianum – Roman consuls M. Fulvius and L. Postumius decisively defeat the Samnites.
 310 BC – Battle of Lake Vadimo – Romans, led by dictator Lucius Papirius Cursor, defeat the Etruscans.

3rd century BC

 Third Samnite War (298–290 BC)
 298 BC – Battle of Camerinum – Samnites defeat the Romans under Lucius Cornelius Scipio Barbatus.
 297 BC – Battle of Tifernum – Romans under Quintus Fabius Maximus and Lucius Cornelius Scipio Barbatus defeat the Samnite army led by Gellius Statius
 295 BC – Battle of Sentinum – Romans under Fabius Rullianus and Publius Decimus Mus defeat the Samnites and their Etruscan and Gallic allies, forcing the Etruscans, Gauls, and Umbrians to make peace
 293 BC – Battle of Aquilonia – Romans decisively defeat the Samnites.
 Wars with Gauls and Etruscans (285–282 BC)
 284 BC – Battle of Arretium – A Roman army under Lucius Caecilius is destroyed by the Gauls.
 283 BC – Battle of Lake Vadimo – A Roman army under P. Cornelius Dolabella defeats the Etruscans and Gauls.
 282 BC – Battle of Populonia – Etruscan resistance to Roman domination of Italy is finally crushed.
 Pyrrhic War (280–275 BC)
 280 BC – Battle of Heraclea – First engagement of Roman and Greek armies, the latter led by Pyrrhus of Epirus, who is victorious, but at great cost.
 279 BC – Battle of Asculum – Pyrrhus again defeats the Romans but once again suffers significant casualties in the process.
 275 BC – Battle of Beneventum – Inconclusive encounter between Pyrrhus and the Romans under Manius Curius.
 First Punic War (264–241 BC)
 261 BC – Battle of Agrigentum – Carthaginian forces under Hannibal Gisco and Hanno are defeated by the Romans, who attain control of most of Sicily.
 260 BC - 
 Battle of the Lipari Islands – A Roman naval force is defeated by the Carthaginians.
 Battle of Mylae – A Roman naval force under C. Duillius defeats the Carthaginian fleet, giving Rome control of the western Mediterranean.
 258 BC – Battle of Sulci – Minor Roman victory against the Carthaginian fleet near Sardinia.
 257 BC – Battle of Tyndaris – Naval victory of Rome over Carthage in Sicilian waters.
 256 BC – 
 Battle of Cape Ecnomus – A Carthaginian fleet under Hamilcar and Hanno is defeated in an attempt to stop a Roman invasion of Africa by Marcus Atilius Regulus.
 Battle of Adys – Romans under Regulus defeat the Carthaginians in North Africa
 255 BC – Battle of Tunis – Carthaginians under Xanthippus, a Greek mercenary, defeat the Romans under Regulus, who is captured.
 251 BC – Battle of Panormus – Carthaginian forces under Hasdrubal are defeated by the Romans under L. Caecilius Metellus.
 250 BC - Siege of Lilybaeum - Siege on the Carthaginian city of Lilybaeum by Roman army under Gaius Atilius Regulus Serranus and Lucius Manlius Vulso Longus. Carthaginian victory.
 249 BC – Battle of Drepana – Carthage under Adherbal defeat the fleet of Roman admiral Publius Claudius Pulcher.
 241 BC – Battle of the Aegates Islands – Roman sea victory over the Carthaginians.
First Illyrian War (229–228 BC)
 Roman-Gallic wars (225–200 BC)
 225 BC – Battle of Faesulae – Romans are defeated by the Gauls of Northern Italy.
 225 BC – Battle of Telamon – Romans under Aemilius Papus and Gaius Atilius Regulus defeat the Gauls.
 222 BC – Battle of Clastidium – Romans under Marcus Claudius Marcellus defeat the Gauls.
 216 BC - Battle of Silva Litana - Roman army under Lucius Postumius Albinus is ambushed by the Boii and crushed under falling trees.
 200 BC – Battle of Cremona – Roman forces defeat the Gauls of Cisalpine Gaul
Second Illyrian War (220–219 BC)
 Second Punic War (218–201 BC)
 218 BC – 
 Battle of Lilybaeum – First naval clash between the navies of Carthage and Rome during the Second Punic War; Roman victory.
 Battle of Cissa – Romans defeat Carthaginians near Tarraco and gain control of the territory north of the Ebro River.
 Battle of the Ticinus – Hannibal defeats the Romans under Publius Cornelius Scipio the elder in a cavalry fight.
 Battle of the Trebia – Hannibal defeats the Romans under Tiberius Sempronius Longus with the use of an ambush.
 217 BC -
 Battle of Ebro River – In a surprise attack, Romans defeat and capture the Carthaginian fleet in Hispania.
 Battle of Lake Trasimene – In another ambush, Hannibal destroys the Roman army of Gaius Flaminius, who is killed.
 Battle of Ager Falernus – Avoiding destruction with deceit, Hannibal escapes Fabius' trap in this small skirmish.
 216 BC – 
 Battle of Cannae – Hannibal destroys the main Roman army of Lucius Aemilius Paulus and Publius Terentius Varro in what is considered one of the great masterpieces of the tactical art.
 Battle of Silva Litana - The Boii ambushed and destroyed a Roman army of 25,000 men
 First Battle of Nola – Roman general Marcus Claudius Marcellus holds off an attack by Hannibal.
 Battle of Cornus - 
 Battle of Hibera -
 Battle of Cumae -
 215 BC – Second Battle of Nola – Marcellus again repulses an attack by Hannibal.
 214 BC – Third Battle of Nola – Marcellus fights an inconclusive battle with Hannibal.
 212 BC –
 First Battle of Capua – Hannibal defeats the consuls Q. Fulvius Flaccus and Appius Claudius, but the Roman army escapes
 Battle of the Silarus – Hannibal destroys the army of the Roman praetor M. Centenius Penula.
 Battle of Herdonia – Hannibal destroys the Roman army of the praetor Gnaeus Fulvius.
 211 BC – 
 Battle of the Upper Baetis – Publius and Gnaeus Cornelius Scipio are killed in battle with the Carthaginians under Hasdrubal Barca
 Second Battle of Capua – Hannibal is not able to break the Roman siege of the city.
 210 BC – 
 Second Battle of Herdonia – Hannibal destroys the Roman army of Fulvius Centumalus, who is killed.
 Battle of Numistro – Hannibal defeats Marcellus once more
 209 BC – Battle of Asculum – Hannibal once again defeats Marcellus, in an indecisive battle
 208 BC – Battle of Baecula – Romans in Hispania (Iberia) under P. Cornelius Scipio the Younger defeat Hasdrubal Barca.
 207 BC –
 Battle of Grumentum – Roman general Gaius Claudius Nero fights an indecisive battle with Hannibal.
 Battle of the Metaurus – Hasdrubal is defeated and killed by Nero's Roman army.
 Battle of Carmona – Romans under Publius Cornelius Scipio besiege the city of Carmona and take it from Hasdrubal Gisco
 206 BC –
 Battle of Ilipa – Scipio again decisively defeats the remaining Carthaginian forces in Hispania.
 Battle of the Guadalquivir – Roman army under Gaius Lucius Marcius Séptimus defeats a Carthaginian army under Hannón at Guadalquivir.
 Battle of Carteia – Roman fleet under Gaius Laelius defeats a Carthaginian fleet under Adherbal
 204 BC – Battle of Crotona – Hannibal fights a drawn battle against the Roman general Sempronius in Southern Italy.
 203 BC – Battle of Bagbrades – Romans under Scipio defeat the Carthaginian army of Hasdrubal Gisco and Syphax. Hannibal is sent to return to Africa.
 202 BC, 19 October – Battle of Zama – Scipio Africanus Major decisively defeats Hannibal in North Africa, ending the Second Punic War.
First Macedonian War (214–205 BC)

2nd century BC
 Second Macedonian War (200–196 BC)
 198 BC – Battle of the Aous – Roman forces under Titus Quinctius Flamininus defeat the Macedonians under Philip V
 197 BC – Battle of Cynoscephalae – Romans under Flamininus decisively defeats Philip in Thessaly
 Roman-Spartan War (195 BC)
 195 BC – Battle of Gythium – With some Roman assistance, Philopoemen of the Achaean League defeats the Spartans under Nabis
 Battle of Placentia (194 BC) – Roman victory over the Boian Gauls
 Battle of Mutina (193 BC) – Roman victory over the Boii, decisively ending the Boian threat.
  Roman-Seleucid War (192 BC – 188 BC)
 191 BC – Battle of Thermopylae – Romans under Manius Acilius Glabrio defeat Antiochus III the Great and force him to evacuate Greece
 190 BC –
 Battle of the Eurymedon – Roman forces under Lucius Aemilius Regillus defeat a Seleucid fleet commanded by Hannibal, fighting his last battle.
 Battle of Myonessus – Another Seleucid fleet is defeated by the Romans
 December, Battle of Magnesia – (near Smyrna) Romans under Lucius Cornelius Scipio and his brother Scipio Africanus Major defeat Antiochus III the Great in the decisive victory of the war.
Aetolian War (191–189 BC)
  Galatian War (189 BC)
 Battle of Mount Olympus – Romans under Gnaeus Manlius Vulso allied with Attalus II of Pergamum deliver a crushing defeat to an army of Galatian Gauls
 Battle of Ancyra – Gnaeus Manlius Vulso and Attalus II defeat the Galatian Gauls again before Ancyra, in what was an almost identical repeat of the Battle of Mount Olympus.
 First Celtiberian War (181–179 BC)
 181 BC – Battle of Manlian Pass – Romans under Fulvius Flaccus defeat an army of Celtiberians.
  Third Macedonian War (171–168 BC)
 171 BC – Battle of Callicinus – Perseus of Macedon defeats a Roman army under Publius Licinius Crassus.
 168 BC, 22 June – Battle of Pydna – Romans under Lucius Aemilius Paullus Macedonicus defeat and capture Macedonian King Perseus.
Third Illyrian War (169–167 BC)
 Maccabean Revolt (167–160 BC)
Lusitanian War (155–139 BC)
 Numentine\Second Celtiberian War (154–133 BC)
 134 BC - Siege of Numantia - Roman forces under Scipio Aemilianus Africanus defeat and raze the Celtiberian city of Numantia.
 Fourth Macedonian War (150–148 BC)
 148 BC – Second battle of Pydna – The forces of the Macedonian pretender Andriscus are defeated by the Romans under Quintus Caecilius Metellus Macedonicus.
 Third Punic War (149–146 BC)
 147 BC - 
 Battle of the Port of Carthage - Roman forces under Lucius Hostilius Mancinus are defeated by the Carthaginians.
 Second Battle of Neferis - Roman forces under Scipio Aemilianus win a decisive victory against Carthage marking the turning point in the Third Punic War.
 146 BC – Battle of Carthage ends: Scipio Africanus Minor captures and destroys Carthage.
 Achaean War (146 BC)
 146 BC – Battle of Corinth – Romans under Lucius Mummius defeat the Achaean League forces of Critolaus, who is killed. Corinth is destroyed and Greece comes under direct Roman rule.
First Servile War (135–132 BC)
 Fregellae's revolt (125 BC)
 Cimbrian War (113–101 BC)
 112 BC - Battle of Noreia - Roman force under Gnaeus Papirius Carbo are defeated by the Cimbri
 109 BC – Battle of the Rhone River – Roman force under Marcus Junius Silanus are defeated by the Helvetii
 107 BC – Battle of Burdigala – Roman forces under Lucius Cassius Longinus are defeated by the Helvetii
 105 BC, 6 October – Battle of Arausio – Cimbri inflict a major defeat on the Roman army of Gnaeus Mallius Maximus
 102 BC - Battle of Aquae Sextiae - Romans under Gaius Marius defeat Teutons, with mass suicides among the captured women.
 101 BC - Battle of Vercellae – Romans under Gaius Marius defeat the Cimbri, who are entirely annihilated.
 Jugurthine War (112–105 BC)
 108 BC – Battle of the Muthul – Roman forces under Caecilius Metellus fight indecisively against the forces of Jugurtha of Numidia
Second Servile War (104–103 BC)

1st century BC

 Social War (91–87 BC) 
 89 BC – Battle of Fucine Lake – Roman forces under Lucius Porcius Cato are defeated by the Italian rebels.
 89 BC – Battle of Asculum – Roman army of C. Pompeius Strabo decisively defeats the rebels.
 First Mithridatic War (90–85 BC)
 87 BC - 86 BC - Siege of Athens and Piraeus - Siege of Athens, which had sided with the Pontic invaders during the First Mithridatic War by Lucius Cornelius Sulla. Roman victory.
 86 BC – Battle of Chaeronea – Roman forces of Lucius Cornelius Sulla defeat the Pontic forces of Archelaus in the First Mithridatic War
 85 BC – Battle of Orchomenus – Sulla again defeats Archelaus in the decisive battle of the First Mithridatic War.
 Second Mithridatic War (83–82 BC)
 82 BC – Battle of Halys – Roman general Lucius Licinius Murena fights Mithridates and Gordius after launching several raids, to which the Romans lose.
 Sulla's civil war (82–81 BC)
 82 BC –
 Battle of the Asio River – Quintus Caecilius Metellus Pius defeats a Popular army under Gaius Carrinas.
 Battle of Sacriporto – Fought between the Optimates under Lucius Cornelius Sulla Felix and the Populares under Gaius Marius the Younger, Optimate victory.
 First Battle of Clusium – Fought between the Optimates under Lucius Cornelius Sulla Felix and the Populares under Gnaeus Papirius Carbo, Popular victory.
 Battle of Faventia – Fought between the Optimates under Quintus Caecilius Metellus Pius and the Populares under Gaius Norbanus Balbus, Optimate victory.
 Battle of Fidentia – Fought between the Optimates under Marcus Terentius Varro Lucullus and the Populares under Lucius Quincius, Optimate victory.
 Second Battle of Clusium – Pompei Magnus defeats a numerically superior Populares army under Gaius Carrinas and Gaius Marcius Censorinus.
 Battle of Colline Gate – Sulla defeats Samnites allied to the popular party in Rome in the decisive battle of the Civil War.
 Sertorian War (80–72 BC)
 80 BC – Battle of the Baetis River – Rebel forces under Quintus Sertorius defeat the legal Roman forces of Lucius Fulfidias in Hispania.
 Third Mithridatic War (73–63 BC)
 73 BC – Battle of Cyzicus – Roman forces under Lucius Lucullus defeat the forces of Mithridates VI of Pontus
 72 BC – Battle of Cabira or the Rhyndacus – Lucullus defeats the retreating forces of Mithridates, opening way to Pontus
 69 BC – Battle of Tigranocerta – Lucullus defeats the army of Tigranes II of Armenia, who was harbouring his father-in-law Mithridates VI of Pontus
 68 BC – Battle of Artaxata – Lucullus again defeats Tigranes.
 66 BC – Battle of the Lycus – Pompey the Great decisively defeats Mithridates VI, effectively ending the Third Mithridatic War
 Third Servile War (73–71 BC)
 73 BC – Battle of Mount Vesuvius – Spartacus defeats Gaius Claudius Glaber
 72 BC – Battle of Picenum – Slave Revolt led by Spartacus defeat a Roman army led by Gellius Publicola and Gnaeus Cornelius Lentulus Clodianus
 72 BC – Battle of Mutina I – Slave Revolt led by Spartacus defeat another army of Romans.
 71 BC – 
 Battle of Cantenna – Roman forces defeated a detached of Spartacus' army led by gladiators Gannicus and Castus
 Battle of Campania – Slave Revolt led by Spartacus defeat a Roman army.
 Battle of Campania II – a Roman army under Marcus Crassus defeats Spartacus's army of slaves.
 Battle of the Siler River – Marcus Crassus defeats the army of Spartacus.
Pompey's Georgian campaign (65 BC)
 Catilinarian Civil War (63–62 BC)
 62 BC, January – Battle of Pistoria – The forces of the conspirator Catiline are defeated by the loyal Roman armies under Gaius Antonius.
 Gallic Wars (59–50 BC) 
 58 BC –
 June – Battle of the Arar (Saône) – Caesar defeats the migrating Helvetii
 July – Battle of Bibracte – Caesar again defeats the Helvetians, this time decisively.
 September – Battle of Vosges – Caesar decisively defeats the forces of the Germanic chieftain Ariovistus near modern Belfort
 57 BC –
 Battle of the Axona (Aisne) – Caesar defeats the forces of the Belgae under King Galba of Suessiones.
 Battle of the Sabis (Sambre) – Caesar defeats the Nervii.
 Battle of Octodurus (Martigny) – Servius Galba defeats the Seduni and Veragri.
 56 BC –
 Battle of Morbihan – Caesar defeats the Veneti in a sea battle.
 55 BC –
 Caesar's invasion of Britain – Caesar crosses the English Channel, winning a battle against the Celtic Britons, but achieves little else.
 54 BC 
 Caesar returns to Britain, and defeats Cassivellaunus. He extracts tribute from the Brittonics, but fails to incorporate Britain as Roman territory.
 52 BC – Battle of Alesia – Caesar defeats the Gallic rebel Vercingetorix, completing the Roman conquest of Gallia Comata.
 War with the Parthian Empire (53 BC) 
 53 BC - Battle of Carrhae – Roman triumvir Crassus is disastrously defeated and killed by the Parthians. Crassus has molten gold poured down his throat by his captors.

 Caesar's Civil War (49–45 BC) 
 49 BC, June – Battle of Ilerda – Caesar's army surround Pompeian forces and cause them to surrender.
 49 BC, 24 August – Battle of the Bagradas River – Caesar's general Gaius Curio is defeated in North Africa by the Pompeians under Attius Varus and King Juba I of Numidia. Curio is killed in battle.
 48 BC, 10 July – Battle of Dyrrhachium – Caesar barely avoids a catastrophic defeat by Pompey in Macedonia
 48 BC, 9 August – Battle of Pharsalus – Caesar decisively defeats Pompey, who flees to Egypt
 47 BC, February – Battle of the Nile – Caesar defeats the forces of the Egyptian king Ptolemy XIII
 46 BC, 4 January – Battle of Ruspina – Caesar loses perhaps as much as a third of his army to Titus Labienus
 46 BC, 6 February – Battle of Thapsus – Caesar defeats the Pompeian army of Metellus Scipio in North Africa.
 45 BC, 17 March – Battle of Munda – In his last victory, Caesar defeats the Pompeian forces of Titus Labienus and Gnaeus Pompey the Younger in Hispania. Labienus is killed in the battle and the Younger Pompey captured and executed.
 War with Pontus
 47 BC, May – Battle of Zela – Caesar defeats Pharnaces II of Pontus. This is the battle where he famously said Veni, vidi, vici. (I came, I saw, I conquered.)
 Liberators' civil war (44–42 BC)
 43 BC, 14 April – Battle of Forum Gallorum – Antony, besieging Caesar's assassin Decimus Brutus in Mutina, defeats the forces of the consul Pansa, who is killed, but is then immediately defeated by the army of the other consul, Hirtius
 43 BC, 21 April – Battle of Mutina – Antony is again defeated in battle by Hirtius, who is killed. Although Antony fails to capture Mutina, Decimus Brutus is murdered shortly thereafter.
 42 BC, 3 October – First Battle of Philippi – Triumvirs Mark Antony and Octavian fight an indecisive battle with Caesar's assassins Marcus Brutus and Cassius. Although Brutus defeats Octavian, Antony defeats Cassius, who commits suicide.
 42 BC, 23 October – Second Battle of Philippi – Brutus's army is decisively defeated by Antony and Octavian. Brutus escapes, but commits suicide soon after.
 Bellum Siculum (42–36 BC) 
 36 BC – Battle of Naulochus – Octavian's fleet, under the command of Marcus Vipsanius Agrippa defeats the forces of the rebel Sextus Pompeius.
 Fulvia's civil war (Perusine War) (41–40 BC)
 41 BC – Battle of Perugia – Mark Antony's brother Lucius Antonius and his wife Fulvia are defeated by Octavian.
 War with the Parthian Empire (40-34 BC) 
 44 BC - Julius Caesar's planned invasion of the Parthian Empire - Aborted due to Caesar's assassination.
 40 BC - Pompeian–Parthian invasion of 40 BC
 36 BC - Antony's Atropatene campaign
 34 BC - Antony's campaign against Armenia
 Final War of the Roman Republic (32–30 BC)
 31 BC, 2 September – Battle of Actium – Octavian decisively defeats Antony and Cleopatra in a naval battle near Greece.
  Cantabrian Wars (29–19 BC)
 25 BC - Battle of Vellica - Roman forces under Augustus against the Cantabri people, Roman victory.
 25 BC - Siege of Aracillum - Roman forces under Gaius Antistius Vetus against the Cantabri people, Roman victory.
 Germanic Battles (16–11 BC)
 Clades Lolliana (16 BC) – The troops of Consul Marcus Lollius Paulinus are defeated by West Germanic warriors in Gaul.
 Battle of Arbalo (11 BC) - Romans under Nero Claudius Drusus defeat the Germans
 Battle of the Lupia River (11 BC) – Roman forces under Augustus's stepson Drusus win a victory in Germany.

1st century

 Bellum Batonianum (6-9) - An alliance of tribes numbering more than 200,000 people in Illyria rise in rebellion, but are suppressed by Roman legions led by Tiberius and Germanicus.
 Early Germanic campaigns (12 BC - 16 AD, but primarily 9-16 AD) - Campaigns in Germania (modern day Germany and the low Countries) against various Germanic tribes
 Battle of the Teutoburg Forest (9) – German leader Arminius ambushes and annihilates three Roman legions under Publius Quinctilius Varus, causing retaliation campaigns by the Romans.
 Battle at Pontes Longi (15) - Indecisive battle between a Roman army under Aulus Caecina Severus and German tribes led by Arminius. 
 Battle of the Weser River (16) - Legions under Germanicus defeat German tribes of Arminius.
 Battle of the Angrivarian Wall (16) - Legions under Germanicus defeat the German tribes of Arminius, ending the campaigns.
 Revolt of Sacrovir (21)
 Battle of Baduhenna Wood (28)
 Roman conquest of Britain (43–96) 
 43 – Battle of the Medway – Claudius and general Aulus Plautius defeat a confederation of British Celtic tribes. Roman invasion of Britain begins
 50 – Battle of Caer Caradoc – British chieftain Caractacus is defeated and captured by the Romans under Ostorius Scapula.
 83 – Battle of Mons Graupius. Romans under Gnaeus Julius Agricola defeat the Caledonians.
 Roman–Parthian War of 58–63 
 58 – Sack of Artaxata by Gnaeus Domitius Corbulo during the Roman–Parthian War over Armenia
 59 – Capture of Tigranocerta by Corbulo.
 62 – Battle of Rhandeia – Romans under Lucius Caesennius Paetus are defeated by a Parthian-Armenian army under King Tiridates of Parthia.
 Boudica's uprising (60–61) 
 60 – Battle of Camulodunum – Boudica begins her uprising against the Romans by capturing and then sacking Camulodunum then moves on Londinium.
 61 – Battle of Watling Street – Boudica is defeated by Suetonius Paullinus
 First Jewish–Roman War (66–73)
 66 – Battle of Beth-Horon – Jewish forces led by Eleazar ben Simon defeat a Roman punitive force led by Cestius Gallus, Governor of Syria
 73 – Siege of Masada – The Sicarii are defeated by the Romans under Lucius Flavius Silva, leading them to commit mass suicide
 Roman Civil War of 68–69 AD 
 69 –
 Winter – Battle of 'Forum Julii' – Othonian forces defeat a small group of Vitellianist auxiliaries in Gallia Narbonensis
 14 April – First Battle of Bedriacum – Vitellius, commander of the Rhine armies, defeats Emperor Otho and seizes the throne.
 24 October – Second Battle of Bedriacum – Forces under Antonius Primus, the commander of the Danube armies, loyal to Vespasian, defeat the forces of Emperor Vitellius.
  Domitian's Dacian War (86–88) 
 87 – Dacian King Decebalus crushes the Roman army at Tapae (today Transylvania, Romania), Legio V Alaudae and general Cornelius Fuscus perish in battle.
 88 – the Romans return and obtain a victory in the same battleground

2nd century

 First Dacian War (101–102) 
 101 – Second Battle of Tapae – Trajan defeats Decebalus, with heavy losses.
 102 – Battle of Adamclisi - Roman forces led by Trajan annihilate a mixed Dacian-Roxolano-Sarmatae army, with heavy casualties on the Roman side.
 Second Dacian War (105–106) 
 106 – Battle of Sarmisegetusa – A Roman army led by Trajan conquers and destroys the Dacian capital. Part of Dacia is annexed to the Roman Empire.
 Roman-Parthian Wars
 115-117 – Trajan's Parthian campaign – Trajan invades Parthia and occupies Ctesiphon.
 161-166 – Roman–Parthian War – Vologases IV invades Armenia, but is pushed back and Ctesiphon is sacked.
 198 – Battle of Ctesiphon – Septimus Severus invades, sacks Ctesiphon, and acquires northern Mesopotamia.
Kitos War (115–117)
Second Jewish Revolt (132–135/136)
 Marcomannic Wars (166–180) 
 170 – Battle of Carnuntum – Marcomannic King Ballomar defeats the Roman Army and invade Italy.
 178-179 – Praetorian Prefect Teratenius Paternus defeats the Quadi.
 179 or 180 – Battle of Laugaricio – Marcus Valerius Maximianus defeats the Quadi in Slovakia.
  Roman Civil War of 193–197 AD 
 193 – Battle of Cyzicus – Septimius Severus, the new Emperor, defeats his eastern rival Pescennius Niger
 193 – Battle of Nicaea – Severus again defeats Niger
 194 – Battle of Issus – Severus finally defeats Niger.
 197, 19 February – Battle of Lugdunum – Emperor Septimius Severus defeats and kills his rival Clodius Albinus, securing full control over the Empire.

3rd century 

See Crisis of the Third Century
   Roman invasion of Caledonia (208-210) - Roman forces led by Septimus Severus invade Caledonia, but are forced to withdraw after suffering heavy casualties.
  Persian wars 
 217 – Battle of Nisibis – Bloody stalemate between the Parthians and the Roman army under Emperor Macrinus.
 231-232 - War between the Sassanids under Ardashir I and Severus Alexander; resulted in humiliating Roman defeat and withdrawal.
 243 – Battle of Resaena – Roman forces under Gordian III defeat the Persians under Shapur I.
 260 – Battle of Edessa – Emperor Shapur I of Persia defeats and captures the Roman Emperor Valerian
 296 or 297 – Battle of Carrhae – Romans under the Caesar Galerius are defeated by the Persians under Narseh.
 298 – Battle of Satala – Galerius secures a decisive victory against Narseh, following a peace treaty.
  Civil wars 
 218, 8 June – Battle of Antioch – Varius Avitus defeats Emperor Macrinus to claim the throne under the name Elagabalus.
 238 – Battle of Carthage – Troops loyal to the Roman Emperor Maximinus Thrax defeat and kill his successor Gordian II.
 274 – Battle of Châlons – Aurelian defeats the Gallic usurper Tetricus, reestablishing central control of the whole empire.
 285 – Battle of the Margus – The usurper Diocletian defeats the army of the Emperor Carinus, who is killed.
  Gothic and Alemannic wars 
 235 – Battle at the Harzhorn - Roman army under Emperor Maximinus Thrax defeats a German army while withdrawing back to Roman territory.
 250 – Battle of Philippopolis – King Cniva of the Goths defeats a Roman army.
 251, Summer – Battle of Abrittus – Goths defeat and kill the Roman Emperors Decius and Herennius Etruscus
 259 – Battle of Mediolanum – Emperor Gallienus decisively defeats the Alemanni that invaded Italy
 268 – Battle of Naissus – Emperor Gallienus and his generals Claudius and Aurelian decisively defeat the Goths.
 268 or 269 – Battle of Lake Benacus – Romans under Emperor Claudius II defeat the Alemanni
 271 –
 Battle of Placentia – Emperor Aurelian is defeated by the Alemanni forces invading Italy
 Battle of Fano – Aurelian defeats the Alamanni, who begin to retreat from Italy
 Battle of Pavia – Aurelian destroys the retreating Alemanni army.
 298 –
 Battle of Lingones – Caesar Constantius Chlorus defeats the Alemanni
 Battle of Vindonissa – Constantius again defeats the Alamanni
  Palmyrene war 
 272 –
 Battle of Immae – Aurelian defeats the army of Zenobia of Palmyra
 Battle of Emesa – Aurelian decisively defeats Zenobia.

4th century

The 4th century begins with civil war resulting in the ascendancy of Constantine I, then, after his death, the progressive Christianization of the empire, and wars with Sassanid Persia and Germanic tribes, punctuated frequently with more civil wars.
 Civil Wars of the Tetrarchy (306–324)
 312 –
 Battle of Turin – Constantine I defeats forces loyal to Maxentius.
 Battle of Verona – Constantine I defeats more forces loyal to Maxentius.
 28 October – Battle of Milvian Bridge – Constantine I defeats Maxentius and takes control of Italy.
 313, 30 April – Battle of Tzirallum – In the eastern part of the Empire, the forces of Licinius defeat Maximinus.
 316, 8 October – Battle of Cibalae – Constantine defeats Licinius
 316 or 317 – Battle of Mardia – Constantine again defeats Licinius, who cedes Illyricum to Constantine.
 324 –
 3 July – Battle of Adrianople – Constantine defeats Licinius, who flees to Byzantium
 July – Battle of the Hellespont – Flavius Julius Crispus, son of Constantine, defeats the naval forces of Licinius
 18 September – Battle of Chrysopolis – Constantine decisively defeats Licinius, establishing his sole control over the empire.
 Wars with Persia (344–363)
 344 – Battle of Singara – Emperor Constantius II fights an indecisive battle against King Shapur II of Persia
 359 – Siege of Amida – Sassanids capture Amida from Romans
 363, 29 May – Battle of Ctesiphon – Emperor Julian defeats Shapur II of Persia outside the walls of the Persian capital, but is unable to take the city.
 363, June – Battle of Samarra (363) – Julian fights the Sassanids and is subsequently killed in battle. Though indecisive, the battle leads to massive losses for the Roman Empire through a forced peace treaty.
 Civil War (350–353)
 351 – Battle of Mursa Major – Emperor Constantius II defeats the usurper Magnentius
 353 – Battle of Mons Seleucus – Final defeat of Magnentius by Constantius II
 Jewish revolt against Constantius Gallus – 351–352 - Rebellion of Jews in Syria Palaestina.
 Wars with Alemanni (356–378)
 356 – Battle of Reims – Caesar Julian is defeated by the Alamanni
 357 – Battle of Strasbourg – Julian expels the Alamanni from the Rhineland
 368 – Battle of Solicinium – Romans under Emperor Valentinian I defeat yet another Alamanni incursion.
 378 –
 May – Battle of Argentovaria – Western Emperor Gratianus is victorious over the Alamanni, yet again.
 Civil War – 366 – Battle of Thyatira – The army of the Roman emperor Valens defeats the usurper Procopius.
 Great Conspiracy – 367-368 - Rebellion in the Hadrian's Wall and failed invasion of Britain by Picts, Scotti, Attacotti, Saxons and Franks.
 Gothic War (376–382)
 377 – Battle of the Willows – Roman troops fight an inconclusive battle against the Goths
Summer -Battle of Dibaltum –Goths, Alans and Huns defeat Romans.
 378 –
 9 August – Battle of Adrianople – Thervings under Fritigern defeat and kill the Eastern Emperor Valens
 380 – Battle of Thessalonica – The new Eastern Emperor, Theodosius I, is also defeated by the Thervings under Fritigern.
 Tanukh revolt against Rome– 378-Spring - the Tanukhids Arabs rebels against Roman rule, led by their queen Mavia in Syria. The revolt end in a truce.
 Civil War – 388 – Battle of the Save – Emperor Theodosius I defeats the usurper Magnus Maximus.
 Civil War – 394, 5–6 September – Battle of the Frigidus – Theodosius I defeats and kills the usurper Eugenius and his Frankish magister militum Arbogast.
 Stilicho's Pictish War – 398(?) 
 Civil War – 398, Gildonic War – Comes Gildo, governor of Africa, rebels against the Western Emperor Honorius.The revolt was subdued by Flavius Stilicho, the magister militum of the Western Roman empire.

5th century 

The 5th century involves the final fall of the Western Roman Empire to Goths, Vandals, Alans, Huns, Franks and other peoples.

 Wars with the Goths (402–419)
 402 – 
 Siege of Asti (402) -  The Visigoths besieged Western Emperor Honorius in Asti until March, when Stilicho sent reinforcements .
 6 April – Battle of Pollentia – Stilicho defeats the Visigoths under Alaric.
 June – Battle of Verona – Stilicho defeats Alaric, who withdraws from Italy.
 405 or 406-
 Siege of Florence - Stilcho defends city from the Goths of king Radagaisus, but Florence is nearly destroyed.
406
 Battle of Faesulae - Stilicho defeats Visigoths and Vandals under Radagaisus.
409-
Battle of Ostia – Visigoths under Alaric I defeat Romans.
 410, 24 August – Sack of Rome – Visigoths under Alaric sack Rome.
 413 – Siege of Massilia – Visigoths under Ataulf are defeated by Romans under Bonifacius while trying to siege Roman city. They make peace with Rome soon after.
 Roman–Sasanian War of 421–422 - The Eastern Roman Emperor Theodosius II declared war against the Persians and obtained some victories, but in the end, the two powers agreed to sign a peace on the status quo ante. 
 Civil War – 432 – Battle of Ravenna – Bonifacius defeats rival Roman general Flavius Aetius, but is mortally wounded in the process.
 War with the Huns (447–451)
 447 – Battle of the Utus – The Eastern Romans fight an indecisive battle with Huns led by Attila.
 451, 20 June – Battle of the Catalaunian Plains – The Romans with Flavius Aetius and the Visigoths with Theodoric, defend against Attila, ruler of the Hunnic Empire.
 452, 18 July –Sack of Aquileia –Aquileia is razed to the ground by the forces of Attila the Hun.
 Fall of the Western Roman Empire (406–476)
 406, 31 December – 
Battle of Mainz – Franks lose to Vandals, Suebi and Alans.
Crossing of the Rhine -A mixed group of barbarians which included Vandals, Alans and Suebi, crossed into northern Gaul. 
 419 – Battle of the Nervasos Mountains – Western Romans and Suebi defeat Vandals and Alans.
 422 – Battle of Tarraco –  The Vandal king Gunderic defeat the Western Romans, making the Vandals the undisputed masters of Hispania.
 425 – Siege of Arles -The Roman general Aëtius defeats the Visigoths under Theodoric I.
 431 - Siege of Hippo Regius – Vandals under Genseric establish a foothold in Africa, strategically defeating Rome. Saint Augustine dies during the siege.
 436 – Battle of Narbonne – Flavius Aetius again defeats the Visigoths led by Theodoric.
 439
 19 October - Battle of Carthage  – Romans lose Carthage to the Vandals.
 Battle of Toulouse  – Visigoths led by Theodoric I defeat Romans under General Litorius, who is killed.
 c. 445-450 - Battle of Vicus Helena  – Romans under Aetius defeat Franks.
 455 
 2 – c. 16 June – Sack of Rome by Geiseric, King of the Vandals
 Battle of Aylesford – Romano-Britons (under Vortimer) and Anglo-Saxons battle in Kent, victory is unclear.
 456 –
 Battle of Agrigentum (456) – An army of the Western Roman Empire, led by the Romano-Suebian general Ricimer, drove off an invading fleet sent by the Vandal king Gaiseric to raid Sicily.
 Battle of Corsica - the Vandals were again attacked by Ricimer and defeated.
 457 –
 Battle of Garigliano (457)  –The new emperor Majorian surprised a Vandal-Berber raiding party which was returning with loot from Campania. 
Battle of Campi Cannini – Roman General Majorian defeats an Alemanni invasion of Italy.
 458  –
 Battle of Toulouse (458) -The Roman Emperor Majorian defeats the Visigoths.
  Late 458 Battle of Arelate  -The Roman Emperor Majorian, with the support of Aegidius and Nepotianus, defeats the Visigoths at Arlate. With a treaty, the Visigothic returned all territory in Hispania to the Romans.
 461 –Battle of Cartagena – A Vandal fleet surprises and destroys the Roman fleet.
 463 – Battle of Orleans – Gallo-Roman and Salian Frank forces under the command of Aegidius defeat a force of Visigoths at Orleans.
 464  – Battle of Bergamo – Romans under General Ricimer defeat Alan invasion of Italy and kill their king.
 468 – Battle of Cap Bon - Failure of the invasion of the kingdom of the Vandals by the Western and Eastern Roman Empires. 
 469 – Battle of Déols  - Visigoths defeat Bretons and Gallo-Romanas under Riothamus.
 471 – Battle of Arles (471) - Visigothic king Euric defeats the Roman general Anthemiolus, captured Arles and much of southern Gaul
 472 – Siege of Rome  - Ricimer, having fallen out with his choice for Roman Emperor, allies with the Burgundians and Germans under Odoacer, defeats and kills the Roman Emperor Anthemius.
 476 – Battle of Ravenna – The Germanic foederati led by Odoacer decisively defeat the Western Roman Empire and depose Emperor Romulus Augustulus. Western Roman Empire dissolved. Odoacer declares himself King of Italy.
 485  – Battle of Mercredesburne  – Saxons under Aelle defeat British defenders.
 486 – Battle of Soissons – Clovis I defeats Syagrius, last Roman commander in Gaul, and annexes the Roman rump state into the Frankish realm.
 c. 500 – Battle of Mons Badonicus – Romano-British  defeat Anglo-Saxons decisively, ending their advance into British land. Later connected to King Arthur.
 Battle of Cotyaeum  - 492 - The Eastern Rome army under John the Scythian defeats Isaurians under Longinus of Cardala.

6th century and beyond 

The Eastern Roman emperor Justinian launched an ambitious reconquest of Italy, North Africa and parts of Spain. However, new invaders like the Avars, Lombards and Slavs, alongside the First plague pandemic  and various volcanic winters ended his ambition of recuperate the West and consolidate the reconquest.

 502–506 Anastasian War with Sassanid Persia.
 526–532: Iberian War with Sassanid Persia.
 Justinian campaigns  (533–555)
 533–534: Vandalic War in Northern Africa.
 534–548: Moorish Wars in Africa.
 535–554: Gothic War in Dalmatia and Italy.
 541–562: Lazic War with Sassanid Persia.
 552–555: Byzantine intervention in the Visigoth civil war in Spain, formation of Spania province.
 560s–578: War with the Romano-Moorish kingdom of Garmul.
 572–591: War with Persia over the Caucasus.
 589: Franco-Lombard-Byzantine conflict over the Po Valley. The war was stopped by breaching dam in Cucca. 
 582–602: War against the Avars and Slavs in the Balkans.

The Eastern Roman empire adopted the Greek language as official language under emperor Heraclius in 610. The Eastern empire shrunk to Greece and Anatolia, because of Persian, Avar and finally Arab invasions.
 602–628: Final Byzantine-Persian war.
 626: Avar–Sasanian siege of Constantinople.
 633–642: Beginning of the Muslim conquests. Progressive loss of Syria, Egypt, Africa and Sicily to the Muslim Caliphates.

References

Sources
 Jones, Jim, (2013). Roman History Timeline. West Chester University of Pennsylvania. http://courses.wcupa.edu/jones/Roman History Timeline .

External links 

 Milites. A Visual Analytics tool on Roman battles.
 Elton, Hugh and Christos Nüssli, "Imperial Battle Map Index". An Online Encyclopedia of Roman Emperors.
 "Roman Battles" map, platial.com

See also
 List of Roman civil wars and revolts

Rome
Wars involving ancient Rome
Roman
 
Roman battles
Wars and battles